Artsadmin is a UK-based organisation that provides support, resources and advisory services for artists working in the fields of performance, dance, live art and mixed media work. It was founded in 1979 by Judith Knight and Seonaid Stewart, and receives support from UK trusts and foundations, including Arts Council England. The organisation is funded predominantly through a National Portfolio Organisation grant. 

Originally founded at Oval House,  it was located at Toynbee Studios.

, Ben Cooper-Melchiors serves as the organisation's executive director, while Róise Goan serves as its artistic director.

Current projects 

Artsadmin works with promoters, producers and other arts organisations in the UK and internationally to develop audiences for the work of its artists, and with other partner organisations on the development of support schemes and resources for artists. 

Up in Arms, Anna-Maria Nabirye and Annie Saunders

Tentacular Spectacular, Oozing Gloop

The Making of Pinocchio, Cade and MacAskill

Walking: Holding, Rosana Cade

Cultural Exchange Rate, Tania El Khoury

Arty Parties, Tarik Elmoutawakil

Say Yes To Who Or What Turns Up, Jennie Moran

Arrivals + Departures, YARA + DAVINA

In March 2023, Artsadmin launched AiR: Artist in Residence - a new artistic residency and employment contract for one artist. This new model involves paying an artist on a salary of £32,000 at 0.7 FTE to develop their practice in collaboration with the communities local to Artsadmin's home in East London.

Programmes

Season for Change 
Season for Change launched in 2020, led by Artsadmin and Julie's Bicycle, and supported by Arts Council England and Paul Hamlyn Foundation. The first programme planned 18 months from 2020-21, as the world counted down to COP26, and aimed to mobilise artists and cultural organisations to put climate action at the heart of their creative practice and platform voices historically excluded from the climate conversation. Season for Change will return in 2023.

Another Route 
Artsadmin is part of a consortium that leads on Another Route, an artistic fellowship that enables a group of performance artists and artist-led companies to embark upon a remarkable journey to internationalise their creative practice through a sensitively curated 18-month programme of international events and residencies. The project is designed and led by a new consortium of independent artists and companies from across the UK who bring to the project a variety of different experiences of working internationally across a broad range of contexts, not always with formal institutional support.

ACT - Art, Climate, Transition 
ACT is a European cooperation project on ecology, climate change and social transition, initiated by ten cultural organisations across the continent working in the fields of performing and visual arts and supported by the Creative Europe Programme of the European Union. ACT emerged from the cultural operators of the preceding Imagine 2020 programme. This European project evolved around raising awareness on the climate crisis, and presenting the arts as a strong designer of possible futures.

Artsadmin Youth 
The Artsadmin Youth programme offers evening sessions in art and performance to 16-21 year old residents of Tower Hamlets.

Artsadmin Youth is supported by Be Part through the Creative Europe programme of the European Union, The Simon Gibson Charitable Trust and the Allen & Overy Ben Ogden Memorial Fund.

Creative Criminal Justice 
Artsadmin delivers multi-disciplinary creative projects in prisons and provide opportunities for people who have lived experience of the criminal justice system to engage in the arts after a prison sentence. Projects include Take Up Space and Unchained Nights. Artsasmin worked closely with Lady Unchained - a poet, performer, host, facilitator and curator.

Lady Unchained was a nominee for the New Voice Award 2020 by Audio Production Awards and Runner Up for CJA Awards 2020- Outstanding Documentary, winner of The Insight awards 2021 for Insight through Journalism. She received a Bronze award for her show Free Flow on National Prison Radio at the ARIAS Awards 2021 and she continues to challenge the ex-offender label through creativity. She also curated the Soul Journey To Truth Exhibition at HOME gallery in Manchester in partnership with Koestler Arts and Ripples of Hope Festival highlighting creativity within the criminal justice system in the North West.

Artist Support 
Artsadmin has established a range of new opportunities for artists with a bursary and mentoring scheme (now ended), a creative support service, the Radar workshop series, Lab residencies, the Artsadmin Anchor weekly newsletter for artist opportunities, and a public programme at Toynbee Studios.

Bursary Recipients

References

External links
Artsadmin
https://www.a-n.co.uk/news/artsadmin-bursary-artists-for-2020-21-announced/
Season for change. https://www.artscouncil.org.uk/blog/season-change

Arts in the United Kingdom